
Gmina Krzywiń is an urban-rural gmina (administrative district) in Kościan County, Greater Poland Voivodeship, in west-central Poland.

The gmina contains part of the protected area called Chłapowski Landscape Park.

Villages
Apart from the town of Krzywiń, Gmina Krzywiń contains the villages and settlements of Bielewo, Bieżyń, Boża Wola, Cichowo, Czerwona Wieś, Gierłachowo, Jerka, Jurkowo, Jurkowo-Huby, Kopaszewo, Kuszkowo, Łagowo, Lubiń, Łuszkowo, Mościszki, Nowy Dwór, Polesie, Rąbiń, Rąbinek, Rogaczewo Małe, Rogaczewo Wielkie, Stary Dębiec, Świniec, Szurkowo, Teklimyśl, Wieszkowo, Wymysłowo, Zbęchy, Zbęchy-Pole, Żelazno and Zgliniec.

Neighbouring gminas
Gmina Krzywiń is bordered by the gminas of Czempiń, Dolsk, Gostyń, Kościan, Krzemieniewo, Osieczna, Śmigiel and Śrem.

References

Polish official population figures 2006

Krzywin
Kościan County